Iron Lung is an EP by Pram, released on 8 February 1993 through Too Pure.

Track listing

Personnel 
Justin Broadrick – recording
Rosie Cuckston – vocals
Sam Owen – bass guitar
Pram – recording
Max Simpson – keyboards, sampler
Andy Weir – drums

References

External links 
 

1993 EPs
Pram (band) albums
Too Pure EPs